The Fashionistas is a 2002 pornographic film directed by John Stagliano and produced by Evil Angel Productions. Shot on 35 mm film, it was a high-budget production (with a budget of about $500,000), with a length of over four and a half hours. The film was a commercial success, selling over 100,000 copies just in its first month of release. In 2003, it set the record for most AVN Award nominations for a single title — 22.

Fashionistas also marks the American debut of Manuel Ferrara. The film has had two sequels, Fashionistas Safado: The Challenge and Fashionistas Safado: Berlin, both still directed by Stagliano. Siffredi, Belladonna and Ferrara reprised their roles in the sequels, which also starred Katsuni and Nacho Vidal.

Plot
The Fashionistas are an up-and-coming group of fetish fashion designers led by Helena (Taylor St. Claire) and based in the Fashion District of Los Angeles. The group is trying to land a deal with Italian fetish fashion designer Antonio (Rocco Siffredi). Antonio, who recently divorced amid highly publicized rumors of extramarital affairs, arrives in Los Angeles in search of an s/m-influenced house to partner with. In order to grab Antonio's attention, the Fashionistas crash his fashion show. Helena wants Antonio to believe she is the creative force behind the Fashionistas, even though it is actually Jesse (Belladonna), her assistant. Jesse also engages in a triangular relation with Helena and Antonio.

Awards and nominations

Live show
There was also a theatrical dance show based on the film called The Fashionistas Live Show at the Krave nightclub at The Aladdin in Las Vegas. The show ran from
October 12, 2004 to February 28, 2008 and
won the 'AVN Special Achievement Award' in 2006.

References

External links
 John Stagliano's Fashionistas The Show
 
 Fashionistas Review and Video
 Fashionistas DVD Reviews
 

2000s pornographic films
2002 films
Alt porn
American pornographic films
AVN Award winners
Bondage pornography
BDSM in films
Films set in Los Angeles
2000s American films